Lytton may refer to:

Places

Australia 
 Lytton, Queensland
 Lytton Reach, a reach of the Brisbane River
 Electoral district of Lytton, Queensland

Canada 
 Lytton, British Columbia, named for Edward Bulwer-Lytton
 Lytton Mountain, aka Mount Lytton (named for the town of Lytton)
 Lytton Township, since 2001 part of Montcerf-Lytton, Quebec

United States of America 
 Lytton, California
 Lytton, Iowa
 Lytton, Ohio
 Lytton, West Virginia

Fictional 
 Lytton, California, a city in Police Quest computer game series

People
A number of important people have held the name Lytton, both as a surname and as a first name, as in Lytton Strachey.
 Lytton (surname)
 Lytton Strachey
 Earl of Lytton (being Edward Bulwer-Lytton and his progeny agnatic, a family named Lytton)

Other uses 
 Lytton Strachey
 Lytton First Nation, aka the Lytton Band, a band government of the Nlaka'pamux people, centred at Lytton, British Columbia
 Lytton High School, a co-educational secondary school in Gisborne, New Zealand
 Lytton Statistical Area, part of the Gisborne suburb of Riverdale, New Zealand
 Lytton (sternwheeler), a lake steamer in British Columbia, Canada
 Henry C. Lytton & Co., popularly called "Lytton's", a department store chain

See also 
 
 
 Litton (disambiguation)